Mangur is one of the largest Kurdish tribes of northwestern Iran. Historically semi-nomadic and war-like, they are native to a basin on the little Zab river called “Mangurayeti” in Mukriyan and also inhabit the districts and cities of Sardasht, Piranshahr, Mahabad, Pshdar District.

Mangur was one of the Kurdish tribes in the Bolbas Federation. The others were: Mâmash, Pirân, Zerzâ, Herki and Shekâk.

Sub-tribes
Mangur households were typically named after their founding patriarch’s mother. This made most Mangur families patrilineal-matronymic as they were surnamed after a paternal grandmother.

The Mangurs are divided in six main different matronymic sub-tribes based on, and named after, their respective foremother. The relationship between these six ancestral mothers is vague and unclear though traditionally they are believed to be either sister-wives or biological sisters. The clan names are as follows:
Amān
Šamʿ
Zīn
Zarrīn
Ḵeder
Morowwat
The 'Amān,' 'Šamʿ,' 'Zīn,' 'Zarrīn,' and 'Ḵeder' clans are mostly based in Piranshahr and Sardasht while the 'Morowwat' clan is based in Mahabad. The largest of these sub-tribes is the 'Morowwat' clan. Historically, these sub-tribes acted as their own tribe and were constantly at war with each other and disunited.

History

In the winter of 1928-29 the Mangur, the Mâmash and other tribes rebelled against Reza Shah and occupied Sardasht though they lacked the forces to extend the revolt more widely. The Mangur were among the tribes to initially back the Soviet-backed Republic of Mahabad in 1946. However support for the republic soon fell after the withdrawal of Russia. The Mangur Tribe, and other surrounding tribes withdrew their support.

Pre-marital romance was tolerated by the Mangurs, as well as other Bolbas tribes, although it was almost always expected the couple soon elope and marry. These love marriages were called “radu khstn.” Most Bolbas women had been in at least one love marriage in their life and it is considered an honor. This caused conflict with the surrounding settled-feudalistic Mokri tribe, whom measured a woman's honor in delicacy and modesty rather than strength and stubbornness, who promoted the ban of this practice. The Mangurs were of the last Kurdish tribes to practice this tradition, continuing the practice until the 1980s.

The Mangur were notorious for banditry and raiding. Female Mangur bandits were also present.

References

Kurdish tribes